Loveman's may refer to:
 Loveman's (Chattanooga), a Chattanooga, Tennessee-based chain of department stores 
 Loveman's (Nashville), also known as Loveman, Berger & Teitelbaum, a Nashville, Tennessee-based full service department store
 Loveman's of Alabama, a Birmingham, Alabama-based chain of department stores with locations across Alabama